Bhajahari Mahato (1911–2003) was an Indian politician belonging to Lok Sewak Sangha. He was elected thrice as a member of the Lok Sabha.

Early life
Mahato was born on 1911. He took part in Civil disobedience movement and August movement. He was arrested during the British Rule. He was sentenced to seven years in prison. Later, he was released in 1946.

Post independence career
After the formation of Lok Sewak Sangha Mahato joined the party from Indian National Congress. He was elected as a member of the Lok Sabha from erstwhile Manbhum South Cum Dhalbhum in 1952 as a Lok Sewak Sangha candidate. Later, he was elected from Purulia in 1962 and 1967.

Role in Bengali language movement in Manbhum
Mahato took part in the Bengali language movement in Manbhum. He raised the issue of Bengali language movement in Manbhum in the Lok Sabha. He wrote Tusu songs during that time. He wrote the Tusu song titled "Shun Bihari Bhai Tora Rakhte Larbi Dang Dekhai". He was arrested by the Government of Bihar during that time.

Personal life
Mahato was married to Shanto Devi in 1926. They had two sons and two daughters.

Death
Mahato died in 2003.

References

1911 births
2003 deaths
India MPs 1952–1957
India MPs 1962–1967
India MPs 1967–1970
Indian National Congress politicians from Bihar
Lok Sabha members from Bihar
Lok Sabha members from West Bengal
Lok Sewak Sangh politicians
People from Purulia district
Indian independence activists from West Bengal
Prisoners and detainees of India
Prisoners and detainees of British India